The Lance (Creek) Formation is a division of Late Cretaceous (dating to about 69 – 66 Ma) rocks in the western United States.  Named after Lance Creek, Wyoming, the microvertebrate fossils and dinosaurs represent important components of the latest Mesozoic vertebrate faunas. The Lance Formation is Late Maastrichtian in age (Lancian land mammal age), and shares much fauna with the Hell Creek Formation of Montana and North Dakota, the Frenchman Formation of southwest Saskatchewan, and the lower part of the Scollard Formation of Alberta.

The Lance Formation occurs above the Baculites clinolobatus ammonite marine zone in Wyoming, the top of which has been dated to about 69 million years ago, and extends to the K-Pg boundary, 66 million years ago. However, the characteristic land vertebrate fauna of the Lancian age (which take its name from this formation) is only found in the upper strata of the Lance, roughly corresponding to the thinner equivalent formations such as the Hell Creek Formation, the base of which has been estimated at 66.8 million years old.

Description 
The formation is described by W.G. Pierce as thick-bedded, buff-colored sandstone, and drab to green shale.  It is Upper Cretaceous in age.

The formation varies in thickness from about 90 m (300 ft.) in North Dakota, to almost 600 m (2,000 ft.) in parts of Wyoming.

Depositional environment 
The Lance Formation was laid down by streams, on a coastal plain along the edge of the Western Interior Seaway. The climate was subtropical; there was no cold season and probably ample precipitation.

Paleontology 
At least tens of thousands of Late Cretaceous vertebrate remains have been recovered from the Lance Formation. Fossils ranging from microscopic elements to extensive bonebeds, with nearly complete, sometimes articulated dinosaur skeletons, have been found.  Most other animals known from the formation are freshwater animals, and some are exclusively freshwater forms (for instance, frogs and salamanders). However, marine fossils are also found in the formation, suggesting that the sea was nearby. The bird fauna is mainly composed of orders still existing today.

Coelurosaurs 
UCMP 143274 (Caenagnathidae?)

Birds

Other coelurosaurs

Ornithischia

Ankylosaurs

Marginocephalians

Ornithopods 
Indeterminate lambeosaurinae fossils have been found in the Lance Formation.

Other vertebrates 
Other land vertebrates include pterosaurs (e.g. cf. Azhdarcho), crocodiles, champsosaurs, lizards, snakes, turtles, frogs and salamanders.

Remains of fishes and mammals have also been found in the Lance Formation.

See also 

 List of fossil sites (with link directory)
 List of dinosaur-bearing rock formations

References

External links 
 Passport-In-Time Microvertebrate Fossil Project

Geology of the Rocky Mountains
Cretaceous geology of Wyoming
Geologic formations of North Dakota
Natural history of Wyoming
Natural history of North Dakota
Maastrichtian Stage of North America
Fluvial deposits